Circus Life (Austrian title, Zirkus Leben, German: Schatten der Manege) is a 1931 German mystery drama film directed by Heinz Paul and starring Liane Haid, Oscar Marion and Trude Berliner. It was shot at the Babelsberg Studios in Berlin and at the Zirkus Busch in the city. It was released in America in 1932.

Synopsis
An acrobat is carrying on affairs with both Elvira Starke, who owns and runs the circus, and Kitty who performs in an equestrian act. He is then shot dead and police investigate.

Cast
 Liane Haid as 	Elvira Starke, Zirkusdirektrice
 Luigi Bernauer as 	Refaingesang
 Fred Bird Rhythmicans as 	Singer
 Oscar Marion as Oskar Haupt, Dompteur
 Trude Berliner as 	Kitty Rallay
 Rolf von Goth as 	Fred Rallay, ihr Bruder
 Karl Ludwig Diehl as 	Luftakrobat
 Walter Rilla as 	Morini. Kunstschütze
 Hermann Picha as 	Edorado, Clown
 Hermann Blaß as Lilienfeldt, Argent
 Valy Arnheim as 	Sprechstallmeister
 Rudolf Meinhard-Jünger as Chef der Mordkommission
 Georg H. Schnell as 	1. Kriminalkommissar 
 Heinrich Wilde as 2. Kriminalkommissar

References

Bibliography 
 Klaus, Ulrich J. Deutsche Tonfilme: Jahrgang 1931. Klaus-Archiv, 2006.
Quinlan, David. The Illustrated Encyclopedia of Movie Character Actors. Harmony Books, 1986.

External links 
 

1931 films
Films of the Weimar Republic
German comedy films
1931 comedy films
1930s German-language films
Films directed by Heinz Paul
German black-and-white films
Films shot at Babelsberg Studios
Films shot in Berlin
Circus films
1930s German films